Evanger is a former municipality in the Voss district of the old Hordaland county in Norway.  The municipality existed from 1885 until 1964 when it was dissolved and its lands split between two municipalities.  The  municipality included the eastern part of the Eksingedalen valley, the area surrounding the lake Evangervatnet, and the Bergsdalen valley.

The administrative centre of the municipality was the village of Evanger where Evanger Church is located.  Evanger Church served the central part of the municipality.  Nesheim Church and Eksingedal Church served the northern part of Evanger and Bergsdalen Church served the southern part of the municipality.

History
The municipality was established on 1 January 1885 when the western district of the large municipality of Voss (population: 2,045) was separated from Voss to become the new municipality of Evanger. During the 1960s, there were many municipal mergers across Norway due to the work of the Schei Committee. On 1 January 1964, the municipality of Evanger was dissolved.  The Bergsdalen and Eksingedalen valleys (population: 251) were merged with parts of the municipalities of Bruvik and Modalen to create the new Vaksdal Municipality. The rest of Evanger, with 1,075 inhabitants, was merged into the neighboring Voss Municipality.

Municipal council
The municipal council  of Evanger was made up of 17 representatives that were elected to four year terms.  The party breakdown of the final municipal council was as follows:

Notable residents

Knute Nelson (1843–1923), United States Senator
Bjørn Rongen (1906–1983),  novelist and children's book writer
Viking Mestad, politician for the Norwegian Liberal Party

See also
List of former municipalities of Norway

References

External links 
Evanger parish

Vaksdal
Voss
Former municipalities of Norway
1885 establishments in Norway
1964 disestablishments in Norway